HC 19 Humenné is an ice hockey team playing in the Slovak Slovak 1. Liga, and formed in 2019. They play in the city of Humenné, Slovakia.

History
Club HC 19 Humenné is a newly established club in the town of Humenné, which wants to build on the successful representation of the town of Humenné in senior hockey. After the announcement of the end of MHK Humenné, members of the new HC 19 Humenné club on behalf of MHK completed the previous 2018/2019 season, where we exemplary represented the city of Humenné in St. Nicolaus I. Men's League. After the maximum possible effort to maintain the premier league license, with the promise of the president of SZĽH, we did not succeed and the club after all legislative procedures to register the club as a new member of the association, will have to start in the 2nd men's league. The primary goal of the project is to develop hockey in the city and thus support the meaningful use of free time and offer the opportunity for the sporting public to attend a quality sporting event. The secondary goal will be to build on the youth sports process to make it easier for the best players to switch to men's hockey in their hometown. It is important to have a real role model for hockey youth in their sport close to home. Club HC 19 Humenné is a civic association. The chairman of the association is Peter Ždiňak, the vice-chairman is Mikuláš Koščo and the members are Tomáš Šudík and Peter Mižák.

References

External links
Official club website 
 

Ice hockey teams in Slovakia
Ice hockey clubs established in 2019
2019 establishments in Slovakia
Sport in Humenné